The Upper Laos campaign (Vietnamese: Chiến dịch Thượng Lào) was a military campaign of the People's Army of Vietnam military campaign aimed at spreading Vietnamese communist influence to Laos in support of the Pathet Lao. While their advance on Luang Prabang ultimately failed, they managed to occupy parts of Phongsaly (see Battle of Muong Khoua), Sam Neua, Xieng Khouang and Luang Prabang Provinces. Furthermore, Souphanouvong established his Laotian Resistance Government in Sam Neua.

References

Sources
 

Battles and operations of the First Indochina War
Battles involving Vietnam
Battles involving France
Conflicts in 1953
1953 in Vietnam
Vietnamese independence movement
1953 in French Indochina
1953 in Laos
April 1953 events in Asia
May 1953 events in Asia